Robat-e Mahmud (also Romanized as Robāţ-e Maḩmūd and Robat Mahmood) is a village in Kenarrudkhaneh Rural District, in the Central District of Golpayegan County, Isfahan Province, Iran. At the 2006 census, its population was 230, in 77 families.

See also
Robat (disambiguation)

References

Populated places in Golpayegan County